Mile 81 is a novella by Stephen King, originally published as an e-book on September 1, 2011. The publication also includes an excerpt from King's novel 11/22/63, published two months later. It has also been collected in the 2015 short story collection The Bazaar of Bad Dreams.

Summary
At Mile 81 on the Maine Turnpike is a boarded-up rest stop, a place where teens drink and get into trouble. Pete Simmons sneaks away from his older brother and arrives there, where he finds a bottle of vodka and pornographic magazines. He drinks enough to pass out.

A mud-covered station wagon (when there had not been any rain in New England for over a week) veers into the Mile 81 rest area, ignoring the sign that says "closed, no services". The driver's door opens but nobody gets out.

Doug Clayton, an insurance man from Bangor, is driving to a conference in Portland. In the passenger bucket is a King James Bible, what Doug calls "the ultimate insurance manual", but it is not going to save Doug when he decides to be the Good Samaritan and help the driver of the broken-down wagon. He pulls up behind it, puts on his hazard lights, and notices that the wagon has no plates. He is then eaten by the wagon.

It is eventually revealed that the "station wagon" is not a station wagon at all, but a sentient, extraterrestrial entity that only assumed the form of an earthly vehicle in order to lure in unsuspecting victims.

Alternate version
In the version in The Bazaar of Bad Dreams, several more characters are eaten by the station wagon, including a horse owner, an insurance man, the parents of two young children, and a police trooper.

Reception
The story received a starred review from Library Journal with Mike Rogers calling it a no-brainer to purchase.  Publishers Weekly called the story unnerving.

Adaptation
In February 2019, it was announced that a film adaptation is in development, with Alastair Lagrand set to direct.

See also
 Stephen King short fiction bibliography

References

 Mile 81 @ StephenKing.com

Novellas by Stephen King
2011 American novels